The Keef–Filley Building at 214 S. Main in Victoria, Texas was built in 1909.  It was a work of building contractor firm Bailey Mills.  It was listed on the National Register of Historic Places in 1987.

It has brick walls and a wood roof & floors system, and a flat roof made of built-up tar and gravel.  It has a Mission Revival-style parapet with vigas extending.  It has a three-bay one-story porch.

It was listed on the NRHP as part of a study which listed numerous historic resources in the Victoria area.

See also

National Register of Historic Places listings in Victoria County, Texas

References

Commercial buildings on the National Register of Historic Places in Texas
Buildings and structures completed in 1909
Buildings and structures in Victoria, Texas
National Register of Historic Places in Victoria, Texas